Walter Maass (born 30 August 1901) was a Nazi Party politician who served briefly as the Deputy Gauleiter and Acting Gauleiter in the Free City of Danzig. He was also a member of the Schutzstaffel (SS) throughout the Nazi regime.

Early years
Born in Kordeshagen (today, Dobrzyca) the son of a carpenter, he went to the district school in Danzig (today, Gdansk) until age 15 and then was apprenticed to a lawyer and notary in Danzig until 1917. He worked as an assistant to the Magistrate of Danzig until January 1919 when he entered military service. He served as a cannoneer in Artillery Regiment 2 of the Reichswehr until discharged with the rank of Gefreiter on 31 October 1920. He then worked as an assistant office manager to a notary in Danzig until 31 August 1922. He left that job to become an administrative clerk with the State Customs Office, a position he would hold until 1933.

Drawn to right wing politics, in July 1921 he joined the Deutschvölkischer Schutz- und Trutzbund, the largest, most active, and most influential anti-Semitic federation in Germany. On 21 August 1921 he co-founded the Deutschvölkischer Wanderbund, a forerunner of the Sturmabteilung (SA) in Danzig. He became a member of the German Social Party, an anti-Semitic and volkisch organization in 1922. In 1924 he joined the Frontbann, an SA front organization formed while the SA was banned. He later joined the SA after the ban was lifted and served until 1931.

Nazi Party career in Danzig
Maass joined the Nazi Party on 2 November 1925 (membership number 21,821) after the ban on it was lifted. As an early member, he would later be awarded the Golden Party Badge. He was one of the leading Nazis in Gau Danzig and served as the Gau's Deputy SA-Führer from 1927 to 1928. During this time he was also the Chairman of the local USCHLA. The Gauleiter of Gau Danzig, Hans Albert Hohnfeldt, resigned on 20 June 1928. After a brief interregnum, on 20 August Maass was selected to be Deputy Gauleiter and was temporarily put in charge as Acting Gauleiter. On 1 March 1929, Maass was replaced by Erich Koch. Maass later served as the Gau Propaganda Leader from March 1931 to March 1933.

On 16 November 1930, Maass was elected to the Danzig Volkstag (parliament) where he would serve until its dissolution on 1 September 1939 when Danzig was annexed by Nazi Germany. During an SA street demonstration in October 1931, Maass was severely injured when he was struck in the head by a hatchet, requiring the insertion of a metal plate in his skull. On 15 March 1933, Maass was dismissed from his position in the Customs Office for his part in a violent demonstration that resulted in breaking the windows at the Social Democratic newspaper, Danziger Volksstimme. He then served for a time as a clerical employee of the Volkstag until 1 November 1933 when, having passed the necessary examination, he became a Volkstag Obersekretär (Senior Secretary).

SS career
In addition to his political career, Maass was a long-serving member of the Schutzstaffel (SS) which he joined on 15 January 1933. Maass led SS-Sturm (company-level) formations of the 36th SS-Standarte in Danzig between January 1934 and June 1937. From June to December 1937 he commanded a Sturmbann (battalion) of the 71st SS-Standarte in Zoppot (today, Sopot). Between then and May 1940, he was assigned to the SS "Nordost" department. From March 1934, he held the rank of Sturmführer (later redesignated Untersturmführer). On 25 April 1936, he was promoted to Obersturmführer, and on 20 April 1939 to Hauptsturmführer.

On 1 May 1940, Maass was assigned to the SS-Sicherheitsdienst (Security Service, SD) District Office in Danzig with the rank of Sturmbannführer. On 15 January 1943 he was briefly attached to the staff of the SS-Oberabschnitt (Main District) "Ostland" in the Reichskommissariat Ostland. Finally, on 1 April 1943, he was transferred to the Reich Security Main Office in Berlin where it is believed he served until the end of the Second World War. No additional details are known about his fate.

References

Sources

1901 births
Year of death missing
Free City of Danzig politicians
Gauleiters
German Social Party (Weimar Republic) politicians
Members of the Volkstag of the Free City of Danzig
Nazi Party officials
Nazi Party politicians
Nazi propagandists
Politicians from Gdańsk
Reich Security Main Office personnel
Reichswehr personnel
SS-Sturmbannführer
Sturmabteilung personnel